The County Fire (formerly known as the Guinda Fire) was a wildfire east of Lake Berryessa in Yolo County and Napa County, California in the United States. The fire, first reported on June 30, 2018, in Rumsey Canyon in the community of Guinda, and was contained on July 17, 2018 after burning . The fire caused mandatory evacuations along Highway 128, County Road 23, and areas around Lake Berryessa, including Monticello Dam. The fire destroyed 20 structures, damaged three, and caused one injury. The fire was started by an improperly installed electric fence for livestock.

Timeline

June
The County Fire was first reported at 2:12 pm on June 30, 2018 in vegetation alongside County Road 63 and Highway 16 in Rumsey Canyon in Guinda in Yolo County and a small part of Napa County in California. The fire was fueled by dry vegetation and was driven by red flag conditions, including high temperatures, gusty winds and low humidity. By the end of the day, the fire had burned  and caused mandatory evacuations in the area.

July
Evacuation advisories were put in place for areas south of County Road 81 and west of County Road 85, as well as areas of Solano County, and additional mandatory evacuations were put in place. The evacuation center at the grange in Guinda was closed and a new evacuation center was open in Esparto. Additional evacuations were put in place for the areas around the Monticello Dam.

CAL FIRE stated that extreme fire behavior was still being observed. The fire continued expanding throughout the day. By the morning of July 3, the fire had burned an additional , reaching . Containment stayed at five percent, though firefighters continued setting up containment lines. On the Fourth of July, the fire had grown to threaten 1,500 structures and was 27 percent contained. Firefighters focused on building containment lines, with inaccessible terrain causing accessibility challenges for fire crews. By the evening, mandatory evacuations along Highway 16 and County Road 53 to Highway 128 were lifted.

Damage inspections started while the fire activity was minimal. All evacuation advisories were lifted on July 5, and mandatory evacuations moved to areas west of Highway 16. Initial findings report nine buildings destroyed, however, by July 7, 10 buildings were reported destroyed and two damaged. All evacuated areas were reopened by July 10.

In total, 20 buildings have been destroyed and three have been damaged. The fire was started by an improperly installed electric fence for livestock. The responsible party was cited under code 4421 for "burning of lands of another." The County Fire was declared contained on July 17, 2018.

Impact

The County Fire burned in rural areas of Northern California, impacting primarily rural natural areas and areas with low populations.

Evacuations

Initial mandatory evacuations took place along county roads and areas west of Highway 16 in the Murphy Ranch area of Guinda. By July 1, the fire had spread into Napa County, specifically rural areas of Lake Berryessa, causing more mandatory evacuations, including the entire Lake Berryessa area north of Highway 128, including all homes around Monticello Dam. Additional areas that were evacuated due to the County Fire include Brooks, including members of the Yocha Dehe Wintun Nation.

Closures

Road closures began on July 1, primarily focused on county roads extending from Highway 128, including those reaching into Markley Resort. Pope Creek Bridge was also closed.

Economic

The fire impacted recreation areas on Lake Berryessa, including the Markley Cove and Pleasant Cove resorts. The properties were put under evacuation warnings, and access to the resorts was closed along Highway 128.

Investigation

The cause of the fire remained unknown until July 11, when CAL FIRE reported that a livestock electric fence, which was improperly installed, was what had started the fire in Guinda. The individual(s) responsible were cited under Public Resource Code 4421 for "burning of lands of another."

References

External links

 

2018 California wildfires
June 2018 events in the United States
July 2018 events in the United States
Wildfires in Napa County, California
Wildfires in Yolo County, California